The Asia/Oceania Zone was one of the three zones of the regional Davis Cup competition in 1992.

In the Asia/Oceania Zone there were three different tiers, called groups, in which teams competed against each other to advance to the upper tier. Winners in Group I advanced to the World Group Qualifying Round, along with losing teams from the World Group first round. Winners of the preliminary rounds joined the remaining teams in the main draw first round, while losing teams competed in the relegation play-off, with the losing team relegated to the Asia/Oceania Zone Group II in 1993.

Participating nations

Draw

  relegated to Group II in 1993.

  and  advance to World Group Qualifying Round.

Preliminary round

South Korea vs. China

Philippines vs. Japan

First round

South Korea vs. Chinese Taipei

Philippines vs. Indonesia

Relegation play-offs

Japan vs. China

Second round

South Korea vs. New Zealand

Indonesia vs. India

References

External links
Davis Cup official website

Davis Cup Asia/Oceania Zone
Asia Oceania Zone Group I